The Phacopina comprise a suborder of the trilobite order Phacopida. Species belonging to the Phacopina lived from the Lower Ordovician (Tremadocian) through the end of the Upper Devonian (Famennian). The one unique feature that distinguishes Phacopina from all other trilobites are the very large, separately set lenses without a common cornea of the compound eye.

Habitat 
As far as currently known, all Phacopina species were marine bottom-dwellers.

Origin 
The Early Ordovician genus Gyrometopus (superfamily Dalmanitoidea, family Diaphanometopidae) is probably close to the common ancestor of the Phacopina. Gyrometopus is phacopid in appearance, but a rostral plate is present, unlike in other Phacopina. However, the rostral plate does not divide the cephalic doublure into a left and right section, but instead the rostral suture defines a semicircle in the frontal ¾ of the doublure.

Description 
The eyes (if present) consist of very large (0.07mm in Tricopelta breviceps to 0.5mm in Phacops rana), separately set lenses without a common cornea (so called schizochroal eyes). However, some Phacopina species lack eyes, such as the species of the genus Ductina.  The natural fracture lines (sutures) of the head run along the top edges of the compound eye. From the back of the eye these cut to the side of the head (proparian) and not to the back. In front of the eye, the right and left facial sutures connect in front of the inflated glabella and consequently the free cheeks (or librigenae) are yoked as a single piece. The part of the skeleton that is ‘tucked under’ (the doublure) has no sutures crossing it to form a rostral plate.The thorax has 11 (rarely 10) segments, the side lobes (or pleurae) are furrowed, and the articulating facets distinct.

Systematics 
 The Phacopina contain 3 superfamilies and 7 families:

Superfamily Phacopoidea
Family Phacopidae (examples: Phacops rana, Ductina vietnamica)
Family Pterygometopidae
Superfamily Dalmanitoidea
Family Dalmanitidae (examples: Dalmanites limulurus, Huntoniatonia oklahomae)
Family Prosopiscidae
Family Diaphanometopidae
Superfamily Acastoidea
Family Acastidae (examples: Coltraneia oufatenensis, Walliserops trifurcatus)
Family Calmoniidae

References

External links
fossilmuseum.net - various photos, some of Phacopina

 
Phacopida
Prehistoric animal suborders
Arthropod suborders
Early Ordovician first appearances
Famennian extinctions